John Angel Bulloch (15 April 1928 – 18 November 2010) was a foreign correspondent for the Daily Telegraph.

He was born in Penarth, Glamorganshire. His father, a Merchant Navy captain, was killed in Barcelona during the Spanish Civil War. Bulloch followed his father's career as a seaman for several years before turning to journalism. His first job, aged 23, was with the Western Mail. The spelling of his birth name was Bullock but he changed it following a typo in his first byline. He joined the Daily Telegraph in 1958.

He was based in Beirut for 7 years. In 1988 he joined the Independent becoming Diplomatic Editor for the Independent on Sunday until his retirement in 1991.

Publications
 
Final Conflict. The War in Lebanon. (1983). Century London. 
The Gulf War : Its Origins, History and Consequences. with Harvey Morris. (1989) Methuen London.

References

External links
 Obituary, The Independent 24 November 2010

1928 births
2010 deaths
British reporters and correspondents
The Daily Telegraph people
The Independent people
20th-century English businesspeople